Flagstaff Hill Fort is a former military fort at Flagstaff Point, Wollongong, New South Wales, Australia.

History

In 1879 the steamship ‘Havilah’ landed three 4.6 tonne, 68 pounder cannon as part of Wollongong Harbour defences against the threat of possible Russian attack. The cannon were designed to fire a shell weighing  up to 1.60 km. They lay unused by the harbour for 18 months without mountings and ammunition. They were finally placed as an inner defense battery by the local volunteer artillery group in 1880. Endeavour Drive now covers the original position.

However, by the mid-1880s it became obvious that enemy cruisers could bombard the port out of range of these obsolete guns. 

In 1890 a larger and more modern 6-inch gun was positioned in a concrete pit near the summit of Flagstaff Hill. Underground rooms protected the ammunition and the gunners. By 1893 further fortifications were completed on Smith’s Hill west of Harbour.

Constructed between 1890-1891, the fort was built with a disappearing gun emplacement. The fort was dug-out of the hill using face brick walls and then earth was placed over the tunnels. The gun was commissioned and first fired in 1892. The gun emplacement was provided with two range finder positions.

The Wollongong Head Lighthouse was constructed near the fort in 1938.

Armaments
 Muzzle Loaded 68 pound cannon (1880 to 1891)
 Breach Loaded 6-inch gun Mk V (150mm) gun (1891 to 1907)

See also

 Military history of Australia
Map coordinates :

References
 NSW Heritage Listing
 Royal Australian Artillery History Company
 The Guns of Woolongong

Batteries in Australia
Buildings and structures in Wollongong
Bunkers in Oceania
Forts in New South Wales
History of Wollongong